Polia Pillin, née Sukonic or Sunockin (September 1, 1909 – July 25, 1992), was a Polish-American ceramist during the 20th century. Born in Częstochowa, Poland, in 1909, she immigrated to the United States in 1924 and settled in Chicago, Illinois. In 1927, she met and married Ukrainian immigrant William Pillin. They lived near Albuquerque, New Mexico, from 1936-1940; Chicago from 1940-1948; and finally Los Angeles, California, from 1946 until their deaths (William in 1985, Polia on July 25, 1992).

Work 
Polia used engobe and glaze techniques to create mid-century motifs painted onto hand-thrown pottery such as pots, vases, plates, bowls, etc., with the majority of subjects involving women, horses, cats, fishes, and other animals. She produced most of her work from her home studio, called the Pillin Art Pottery Company, which was set up in the family's garage in Los Angeles. Decorated pieces of Pillin pottery generally sell for $350–$4,000.

List of Notable Exhibitions 
San Francisco Art Association, 1939
Art Institute of Chicago, 1947, 1948
San Francisco Museum of Art, 1948
Los Angeles County Museum of Art, 1948, 1950
Oakland Museum, 1950
California State Fair, 1951 (prize)
Exhibition of ceramic ware, Willow Gallery in Greenwich Village, New York City, October 1955
Exhibition of ceramic painting, Circle in the Square Theater in Greenwich Village, New York City, October 1955
Who's Who in American Art, 1940-1963
Exhibition at Long Beach Museum of Art, Long Beach, California, November 15–December 6, 1960
Art show of ceramics and ceramic paintings, Willow Gallery in Greenwich Village, New York City, September 28–October 28, 1961

References

External links
Pillin Pottery information website

1909 births
1992 deaths
20th-century ceramists
Polish emigrants to the United States
American women painters
American women ceramists
American ceramists
Artists from Los Angeles
Artists from Chicago
20th-century American women artists